Connor O'Brien (born 12 July 2004) is an English professional footballer who plays as a defender for  club Accrington Stanley.

Career
O'Brien first joined the youth set-up at Accrington Stanley at the age of eight, and went on to captain the under-18s to the fourth round of the FA Youth Cup in 2021–22. He signed his first one-year professional contract in June 2022. On 3 December 2022, he joined Northern Premier League Premier Division club Radcliffe on a one-month loan. He scored on his debut later that day, in a 2–2 draw at Matlock Town. He played a total of seven games for Radcliffe. He made his first-team debut in the English Football League with Accrington after coming on as an 80th-minute substitute for Rosaire Longelo in a 1–1 draw at Port Vale on 7 February 2023. On 13 February 2023, Radcliffe extended his loan by a further 2 months.

Career statistics

References

2005 births
Living people
People from Accrington
English footballers
Association football defenders
Accrington Stanley F.C. players
Radcliffe F.C. players
Northern Premier League players
English Football League players